George Heath (1862–1943) was an early American racing driver. A native Long Islander who spent much of his time in France, he won the first Vanderbilt Cup race in 1904 driving a Panhard and was retroactively awarded the 1904 National Championship in 1951. Heath returned to the Vanderbilt Cup in 1905 and placed second. He continued to race until 1909.

External links

George Heath Bio at Historic Racing
 George Heath (VanderbiltCupRaces.com)

1862 births
1943 deaths
People from Long Island
Racing drivers from New York (state)